Archimandrite Dorotheos (born Dzhuma Dbar, January 18, 1972, village Mgudzirkhua, Gudauta District) is the archimandrite of Holy Metropolis of Goumenissa, Aksiupol and Policastro under the Ecumenical Patriarchate of Constantinople and a chairman of the Holy Metropolis of Abkhazia (HMA).

He is an author of two scientific monographs, several books, more than 150 publicistic articles and the chief editor of the religious and educational magazine “Alasharbaga” and the head of the cultural and educational center “Aduney”. Archimandrite Dorotheos also translated Liturgical texts from Ancient Greek, Modern Greek, the Church Slavonic language into Abkhazian and Russian.

Timeline
In 1991 he entered the Abkhazian State University at the faculty of art as a painter-decorator.

In 1993 entered the Moscow Theological Academy and Seminary and in 2001 graduated from the Academy with excellent marks and defended PhD Thesis «History of Christianity in Abkhazia in the first millennium».

In August 2001, the head of Sukhum-Abkhazian Eparchy priest Vissarion Aplia sent a written recommendation to a bishop of Maikop and Adigeya to ordain Dorotheos Dbar to a priesthood. On August 26, 2001 he was ordained a monk, named Dorotheos by Bishop of Maikop and Adygea Panteleimon Kutovoy in the St. Michael Monastery (The Republic of Adygea, Russia). On August 29, 2001 at the Trinity Cathedral in Maikop was ordained a hierodeacon by the same bishop and September 9, 2001 was ordained to the rank of presbyter (hieromonk).

On March 10, 2002 he got the right to move to another Diocese.

Dorotheos Dbar opened the Religious school in New Athos Monastery. In 2002 he founded the New Athos Seminary. Fr. Dorotheos was a rector of the Seminary from 2002 to 2006 and also taught the following disciplines: Dogmatic theology, Patrology, Apologetics, Pastoral Theology, Homiletics, Canon law, History of the Abkhazian Church, Sect Studies and History of religions.

Since 2007 served as a monk in the monastery of Sts. Raphael, Nicholas and Irene (Paeonia, Greece). Since 2007 Dorotheos Dbar served in the Holy Metropolis of Goumenissa, Aksiupol and Policastro. Then he served in the temple of St. Demetrius of Thessaloniki in Aksiupol (Greece).

He was admitted to the doctoral program of Aristotle University of Thessaloniki on October 29, 2009.
On April 21, 2011 Dorotheos Dbar was ordained to the rank of Archimandrite by Metropolitan of Goumenissa, Aksiupol and Policastro Demetrius Bekiaris in the monastery of Our Holy Mary (Goumenissa, Greece).

On May 15, 2011 fr. Dorotheos was elected as chairman of the Holy Metropolis of Abkhazia at the Church National Assembly. Raul Khajimba, then-leader of the opposition, supported Archimandrite Dorotheus.

On May 26, 2011 because of the convening of the Church National Assembly and the creation of the Holy Metropolis of Abkhazia Dorotheos Dbar was banned to serve for one year by Bishop of Maikop and Adygea Tikhon. On June 8, 2012 the ban was extended for three years. Prohibitions were not recognized by bishops of other Orthodox Churches, Archimandrite Dorotheos went on serving in Abkhazia and Greece.

On May 4, 2014 Dorotheos Dbar defended a doctoral thesis successfully at the Theological Faculty of Aristotle University of Thessaloniki. The theme of his doctoral thesis was «The Place of death and burial of St. John Chrysostom» («Ο τόπος θανάτου και ενταφιασμού του αγίου Ιωάννου του Χρυσοστόμου»).

Dorotheos Dbar returned to Abkhazia finally in May 2014. Since 2015 he has delivered lectures at the Seminary of the New Athos monastery.

See also

References

1972 births
Abkhazian State University alumni
Aristotle University of Thessaloniki alumni
Eastern Orthodox theologians
Eastern Orthodox missionaries
Archimandrites
Abkhazian religious leaders
Living people
People from Gudauta District